Into the Great Wide Open is the eighth studio album by American rock band Tom Petty and the Heartbreakers, released in July 1991. The album was the band's last with MCA Records. The album was the second Petty produced with Jeff Lynne after the success of Full Moon Fever.

The first single, "Learning to Fly", became the band's joint longest-running No. 1 single (along with "The Waiting" from 1981's Hard Promises) on Billboards Mainstream Rock Tracks chart, spending six weeks at the top spot. The second single, "Out in the Cold", also made No. 1 on the Mainstream Rock chart, albeit for two weeks.

The music video for the title song stars Johnny Depp as "Eddie", who moves to Los Angeles as a teenager to seek rock stardom, along with Gabrielle Anwar, Faye Dunaway, Matt LeBlanc, Terence Trent D'Arby, and Chynna Phillips.

Critical reception
Into the Great Wide Open was warmly received by critics. Dave DiMartino, reviewing the album for Entertainment Weekly, said that the album was the closest "classic" album Petty and the band had made in 15 years, saying that the album was a return to their first two albums. He feels that this is due largely to Jeff Lynne and that the songs are better than the ones on Full Moon Fever. Rolling Stone critic Parke Puterbaugh called the album a cross between Full Moon Fever and Damn the Torpedoes, said that it features Petty's best lyrics, and that it is much better than Let Me Up (I've Had Enough). 

Stephen Thomas Erlewine of AllMusic was less impressed, saying that Into the Great Wide Open sounds too much like Full Moon Fever, and that the album was "pleasant" but was not Petty at his best. In his Consumer Guide, Robert Christgau gave the album a one-star honorable mention, indicating "worthy effort consumers attuned to its overriding aesthetic or individual vision may well like".

"Attention, Cassette listeners ..."
At the end of the cassette format of Side One, there is a brief spoken interlude by Tom Petty. It is a tongue-in-cheek reference to the "Hello CD Listeners" interlude from Full Moon Fever, this time instructing cassette listeners on how to properly flip over their tape and prepare it for side 2.

Singles
The first single "Learning to Fly" was released prior to the album on June 17, 1991, and was a big hit for Petty. The second single, the title track, was released shortly after the album's release and is also one of the band's biggest hits. They were both top 10 singles on various charts. The third single "Out in the Cold" was a minor hit; it did not achieve the commercial success of the first two. Throughout 1992, four other singles were released; "Makin' Some Noise", "All Or Nothin'" "Too Good To Be True" and "King's Highway".

Track listing

Personnel
Tom Petty and the Heartbreakers

Tom Petty – lead vocals, guitars (acoustic, electric, 12-string), keyboards, percussion
Mike Campbell – guitars (lead, 12-string, bass, resonator, slide), keyboards, backing vocals on "Learning to Fly"
Benmont Tench – acoustic and electric pianos, synthesizer, accordion
Howie Epstein – bass guitar, backing vocals
Stan Lynch – drums, percussion

Additional musicians

 Jeff Lynne – guitars, bass, backing vocals, piano, synthesizer, percussion, sound effects, producer
Roger McGuinn – backing vocal on "All The Wrong Reasons"
Richard Tandy – synthesizer on "Two Gunslingers"

Additional personnel

 Mike Campbell – producer
 Richard Dodd – engineer
 Jeff Lynne – producer
 Tom Petty – producer

Charts

Weekly charts

Year-end charts

Certifications

References

Tom Petty albums
Albums produced by Jeff Lynne
Albums produced by Tom Petty
1991 albums
MCA Records albums